Henry Ziegler (February 10, 1889 – July 1968) was an American painter. His work was part of the painting event in the art competition at the 1936 Summer Olympics.

References

1889 births
1968 deaths
20th-century American painters
20th-century American male artists
American male painters
Olympic competitors in art competitions
People from Sherman, Texas